The Technoavia SM92 Finist is a utility aircraft with a STOL capability, designed by the Russian company Technoavia. The maiden flight was on 28 December 1993. It is built by the Smolensk Aviation Plant.

Variants 

 SM92 Finist
Basic version, powered by 270 kW (360 hp) Vedeneyev M14P radial engine.
 SM92P Finist
Armed version for Border guard duties.  Two fixed forward firing PK machine guns and one inside cabin firing through open cabin doors and two rocket launchers.
 SM-92T Turbo Finist
Version powered by Walter M601 turboprop engine. One prototype converted. 
 SMG-92 Turbine Finist
Walter M601 powered version built in Slovakia by Aerotech Slovakia for use in skydiving. At least six converted.
 Zlin Z400
Version powered by Orenda OE600 V-8 engine, planned to be built by Moravan Otrokovice in the Czech Republic. One built.
 Orbis Avia SM-92T
 SM-92T built by Czech aircraft manufacturer Orbis Avia. One built 2015, fitted with  GE H75 turboprop in 2017.

Operators

Russian Border Guards

Specifications (SM92)

References

 Hopkins, Harry. "Flight Test:Russian Workhorse". Flight International, 3–9 August 1994. pp. 32–34.

 Taylor, Michael J.H. Brassey's World Aircraft & Systems Directory 1999/2000. London:Brassey's, 1999. .

External links 

Finist at flugzeuginfo.net
Finist at airliners.net
Turbo-Finist SM-92T at mga.ru
СМ-92 Финист at airwar.ru 
Technoavia SM92 Finist at utility-aircraft.com

1990s Soviet and Russian civil utility aircraft
High-wing aircraft
SM-92
Single-engined tractor aircraft
Aircraft first flown in 1993